Ferran Bassas Navarra (born 29 April 1992) is a Spanish professional basketball player for Gran Canaria of the Spanish Liga ACB and EuroCup.

Professional career 
On 30 April 2017, Bassas won the Basketball Champions League with Tenerife. He spent the 2019–20 season with Burgos. On 2 July 2020, Bassas signed with Joventut Badalona.

On July 5, 2022, Bassas signed with Gran Canaria of the Liga ACB and EuroCup.

References

External links 
Liga ACB Profile

1992 births
Living people
Basketball players from Barcelona
CB Canarias players
CB Gran Canaria players
CB Miraflores players
CB Prat players
Liga ACB players
Oviedo CB players
Joventut Badalona players
Point guards
Spanish men's basketball players